Madhuca oblongifolia is a species of plant in the family Sapotaceae. It is endemic to the Philippines.  It is threatened by habitat loss.

References

Flora of the Philippines
oblongifolia
Vulnerable plants
Taxonomy articles created by Polbot